Gennady Nikolayevich Lazutin (born March 21 1966)  is a Soviet-born, Russian cross-country skier who competed from 1991 to 1995. His best World Cup finish was 12th in a 15 km event in the Soviet Union in 1991. Lazutin finished 15th in the 30 km event at the 1994 Winter Olympics in Lillehammer.

He is married to cross-country skier Larisa Lazutina.

Cross-country skiing results
All results are sourced from the International Ski Federation (FIS).

Olympic Games

World Cup

Season standings

References

Olympic 4 x 10 km relay results: 1936-2002

External links

1966 births
Cross-country skiers at the 1994 Winter Olympics
Living people
Olympic cross-country skiers of Russia
Russian male cross-country skiers
Soviet male cross-country skiers